Al-Mejar Al-Kabir District is a district of the Maysan Governorate, Iraq. Its seat is the town of Majar al-Kabir.

Districts of Maysan Province